KYCH-FM (97.1 MHz) is a commercial radio station in Portland, Oregon.  It is owned by Audacy, Inc. and airs an adult hits radio format branded as "97.1 Charlie FM."  KYCH-FM plays a fairly wide mix of music, mostly from the rock and pop genres, from the 1960s to today; much of the playlist is made up of modern rock and classic rock from the MTV music video era of the 1980s and 1990s. From mid-November through December 25 Charlie plays exclusively Christmas music. The station does not have disc jockeys, instead playing amusing or ironic messages after every three or four songs.

KYCH-FM's studios and offices are on SW Bancroft Street in Downtown Portland.   The transmitter is atop Portland's West Hills, off SW Fairmount Court.  The effective radiated power is 97,000 watts (100,000 with beam tilt).

History
On September 3, 1946, KPFM signed on the air at 94.9 MHz.  KPFM was owned by Broadcasters Oregon, Ltd., and was powered at 1,530 watts.  It was a stand-alone FM station, not affiliated with an AM station, and never had any connection to local television station KPTV.  KPFM moved to 97.1 MHz on July 31, 1947, broadcasting a classical music format.

In 1960, KPFM was bought by Chem-Air, Inc., a subsidiary of Boeing.  Chem-Air supplied stores and restaurants with background music, via a subscription radio service not available on regular FM radios.  KPFM's transmitter was used for the service.  Chem-Air also put an AM station on the air, named KPAM, at 1410 kHz.  KPAM was originally a daytimer, required to sign off at sunset; for the first several decades, the two stations simulcast their programming.  On December 16, 1961, KPFM became the first station in Oregon to broadcast in stereo.  KPAM and KPFM were acquired by Romito, Inc. in 1965.

On February 27, 1970, KPFM changed its call sign to KPAM-FM.  KPAM-AM-FM ran a Top 40 format as "K-Pam." In 1980, Duffy Broadcasting acquired KPAM-AM-FM.  In September of that year, KPAM-AM-FM changed to KCNR and KCNR-FM, as the "Center" of the FM dial. The two stations aired an adult contemporary format.

Even though most FM stations in larger cities could not fully simulcast after 1968, because AM 1410 was a daytimer, the two were permitted to air the same programming most of the time. In 1985, the two stations were sold to different owners, with KCNR-FM being acquired by Fort Vancouver Broadcasting. On November 14, 1985, KCNR-FM changed call letters to KKLI and rebranded as "K-Lite 97 FM," with a soft adult contemporary format.

In 1988, Heritage Media acquired KKLI, the owners of KKSN in suburban Vancouver, Washington. On February 5 of that year, KKLI switched its call sign to KKSN-FM, and the following day, changed its format to oldies, simulcasting with the AM, which had been carrying classical music.  The two stations called themselves "KISN" as in "Kissin'."

In April 1998, Entercom Communications acquired KKSN-AM-FM.  On April 21, 2005, at 2 p.m., after playing "American Pie" by Don McLean, KKSN-FM flipped to the current adult hits format as "Charlie FM" (the oldies format moved to exclusively to the AM). The first song on "Charlie" was "Start Me Up" by The Rolling Stones. The call letters were changed to KYCH on April 29, 2005.

HD Radio
KYCH broadcasts in the HD Radio format.  KYCH-HD2 airs a dance music and classic disco format branded as "Funkytown".

See also
List of radio stations in Washington

References

External links

YCH-FM
Adult hits radio stations in the United States
Radio stations established in 1946
1946 establishments in Oregon
Audacy, Inc. radio stations